The Competitive Carriers Association (commonly the CCA) was founded in 1992 by nine small wireless carriers in the United States as a 501(c)(6) non-profit trade association to promote the common interests of competitive, regional, and rural wireless services providers.  Its counterpart, particularly for non-regional wireless carriers, is the CTIA.

History
The organization was founded in 1992 as the Rural Carriers Association (RCA), but became the Competitive Carriers Association in 2012 as national carriers Sprint and T-Mobile US joined.  It has long advocated for policies and standards that promote greater competitive in the wireless industry, particularly with regard to issues around wireless spectrum.

References

External links 

Telecommunications organizations
Wireless networking
Trade associations based in the United States
Trade shows in the United States
1992 establishments in the United States
Organizations established in 1992
501(c)(6) nonprofit organizations
Non-profit organizations based in Washington, D.C.